A ribāṭ (hospice, hostel, base or retreat) is an Arabic term for a small fortification built along a frontier during the first years of the Muslim conquest of the Maghreb to house military volunteers, called murabitun, and shortly after they also appeared along the Byzantine frontier, where they attracted converts from Greater Khorasan, an area that would become known as al-ʻAwāṣim in the ninth century CE.

These fortifications later served to protect commercial routes, as caravanserais, and as centers for isolated Muslim communities as well as serving as places of piety.

The word ribat in its abstract refers to voluntary defense of Islam, which is why ribats were originally used to house those who fought to defend Islam in jihad. They can also be referred to by other names such as khanqah, most commonly used in Iran, and tekke, most commonly used in Turkey.

Classically, ribat referred to the guard duty at a frontier outpost in order to defend dar al-Islam. The one who performs ribat is called a murabit. Contemporary use of the term ribat is common among jihadi groups such as al-Qaeda or the Islamic State of Iraq and the Levant. The term has also been used by Salafi jihadis operating in the Gaza Strip. In their terminology, ʻArḍ al-Ribat "Land of the Ribat" is a name for Palestine, meaning it is a place of reconquest and jihad.

As caravanserais
In time, some ribats became hostels for voyagers on major trade routes (caravanserai).

As Sufi retreats
In time, some ribats became refuges for mystics. In this last sense, the ribat tradition was perhaps one of the early sources of the Sufi mystic brotherhoods, and a type of the later zawiya or Sufi lodge, which spread into North Africa, and from there across the Sahara to West Africa. Here the homes of marabouts (religious teachers, usually Sufi) are termed ribats. Such places of spiritual retreat were termed Khānqāh. Some important ribats to mention are the Rabati Malik (c.1068–80) which is located in the desert of central Asia and is still partially intact and the Ribat-i Sharaf from the 12th century which was built in a square shape with a monumental portal, a courtyard, and long vaulted rooms along the walls. Most ribats had a similar architectural appearance which consisted of a surrounding wall with an entrance, living rooms, storehouses for provisions, a watch tower used to signal in the case of an invasion, four to eight towers, and a mosque in large ribats.

Ribat was originally used as a term to describe a frontier post where travelers (particularly soldiers) could stay. The term transformed over time to become known as a center for Sufi fraternities. The ribats were converted to a peaceful use where Sufis could congregate. Usually the ribats were inhabited by a shaykh and his family and visitors were allowed to come and learn from him. Many times the tomb of the founder was also located in the same building. The institutionalization of these centers was made possible in part through donations from wealthy merchants, landowners, and powerful leaders. Some of these compounds also received regular stipends to maintain them.

These institutions were used as a sort of school house where a shaykh could teach his disciples the ways of the specific ṭarīqah (Sufi brotherhood or fraternity). They were also used as a place of worship where the shaykh could observe the members of the specific Sufi order and help them on their inner path to ḥaqīqah (Ultimate truth or reality).

Female Sufis
Another use of ribat refers to a sort of convent or retreat house for Sufi women. Female shaykhas (شيخة), scholars of law in medieval times, and large numbers of widows or divorcees lived in abstinence and worship in ribats. Some of these women stayed in the ribats until they were able to remarry in an effort to maintain their reputation because divorced women were not widely accepted in Islamic society.

See also
 Al-Awasim, Muslim side of the frontier between the Byzantine Empire and Early Islamic realm
 Khan, Persian word for caravanserai; Turkish variant: han 
 Khanqah, building used specifically by a Sufi brotherhood
 Ksar, North African (usually Berber) fortified village
 List of caravanserais
Rabad, Central Asian variant for 'rabat'
Rabat (disambiguation), Semitic word for "fortified town" or "suburb"
Robat (disambiguation), Persian variant for 'ribat'

List of Early Muslim ribats
 Cafarlet in Israel
 Minat al-Qal'a in Israel

References

 Cache of The Ribat by Hajj Ahmad Thomson, 23 06 2007.
 "The Ribats in Morocco and their influence in the spread of knowledge and tasawwuf" from: al-Imra'a al-Maghribiyya wa't-Tasawwuf (The Moroccan Woman and Tasawwuf in the Eleventh Century) by Mustafa 'Abdu's-Salam al-Mahmah)
 Majid Khadduri, War And Peace in the Law of Islam (Baltimore, Johns Hopkins University Press, 1955), . p. 81.
 Hassan S. Khalilieh, "The Ribat System and Its Role in Coastal Navigation," Journal of the Economic and Social History of the Orient, 42,2 (1999), 212–225. 
 Jörg Feuchter, "The Islamic Ribаt - A Model for the Christian Military Orders? Sacred Violence, Religious Concepts and the Invention of a Cultural Transfer," in Religion and Its Other: Secular and Sacral Concepts and Practices in Interaction. Edited by Heike Bock, Jörg Feuchter, and Michi Knecht (Frankfurt/M., Campus Verlag, 2008).

External links
 With a map and list of Seljuk hans.
Introduction and definition
Origins of the Han. The evolution of stopping posts from the Ancient Near East, through the Early Muslim ribats, to the Seljuk han (Turkish for caravanserai); with a list of "Great Seljuk era hans and ribats in Central Asia and Iran"
ArchNet: Origin and layout of a ribat and its adaptation as a caravanserai. Accessed May 2021.

Forts
 
Muslim conquest of the Maghreb
Maghreb
Islamic architecture
Arabic fortifications